The canton of Seyssel  is a former administrative division in eastern France. It was disbanded following the French canton reorganisation which came into effect in March 2015. It had 6,798 inhabitants (2012).

The canton comprised 5 communes:
Anglefort
Chanay
Corbonod
Culoz
Seyssel

Demographics

See also
Cantons of the Ain department

References

Former cantons of Ain
2015 disestablishments in France
States and territories disestablished in 2015